Melocactus ernesti is one of the Turk's cap cacti, and is native to Bahia and Minas Gerais States, Brazil. The lower body is green and has about 13 ribs or ridges, each with a row of spines usually about 1 to 2 inches (2.5 to 5 centimeters) long, but the spines can occasionally be as much as ten inches (25 centimeters) in length, exceeded only by Ferocactus emoryi subspecies rectispinus. Above this is the red, columnar capitulum (similar in form to the much smaller composite inflorescences of Rudbeckia and Echinacea) which is perennial,  composed of hundreds of small, tightly packed flowers and grows a little longer each year.

References

ernestii